is a district located in Mie Prefecture, Japan.

As of the Kusu merger but with 2003 population estimates, the district has an estimated population of 57,507 and a density of 473 persons per km2. The total area is 121.59 km2.

Towns and villages
Asahi
Kawagoe
Komono

Merger
On February 7, 2005 the town of Kusu was merged into the city of Yokkaichi.

Districts in Mie Prefecture